T. H. Kleinschmidt House is a historic house in Helena, Montana. It was built in 1892 for T. H. Kleinschmidt, his wife and their six children. Kleinschmidt was a Prussian-born immigrant who invested in placer mining and later co-founded the First National Bank of Helena with Governor Samuel Thomas Hauser (who lived at the Hauser Mansion). It was designed in the Victorian architectural style by W. E. Norris. It has been listed on the National Register of Historic Places since August 6, 1980.

References

Houses on the National Register of Historic Places in Montana
Queen Anne architecture in Montana
Houses completed in 1892
Houses in Lewis and Clark County, Montana
1892 establishments in Montana
National Register of Historic Places in Helena, Montana